The 1996 African Men's Handball Championship was the twelfth edition of the African Men's Handball Championship, held in Cotonou, Benin, from 18 to 27 October 1996. It acted as the African qualifying tournament for the 1997 World Championship in Japan.

Algeria win their sixth title beating Tunisia in the final game 21–19 after the first extra time of the history in the finals of the competition.

Qualified teams

Group stage

Group A

Group B

Knockout stage

Semifinals

Ninth place game

Seventh place game

Fifth place game

Third place game

Final

Final ranking

References

African handball championships
Handball
A
Handball in Benin
1996 in Beninese sport
October 1996 sports events in Africa